The Krieger Mountains are a mountain range near Oobloyah Bay in northern Ellesmere Island, Nunavut, Canada. The Kriegar Mountains contain Mesozoic stratigraphy.

See also
List of mountain ranges
Arctic Cordillera

Mountain ranges of Qikiqtaaluk Region
Arctic Cordillera